The St. James the Apostle Cathedral Also Fontibón Cathedral Officially the Parish Cathedral of St. James the Apostle of Fontibón, is a cathedral church of Catholic worship consecrated under the patronage of the St. James the Apostle in Fontibón, in the South American country of Colombia. It is the Cathedral Church of the Diocese of Fontibón and, therefore, seat of the titular Bishop.

It is a Spanish Colonial style building located in the eastern corner of the main park of the town of Fontibón of Bogotá, in the 18th street with 99 street. The cathedral occupies the whole block together with the Casa Cural, the Episcopal Curia and the Parish School. The building is the highest structure in the area.

Was rebuilt between 1621 and 1632, being restored between 1945 and 1955.

See also
Roman Catholicism in Colombia
St. James

References

Roman Catholic cathedrals in Colombia
Roman Catholic churches completed in 1617
Roman Catholic churches in Bogotá
17th-century Roman Catholic church buildings in Colombia